Suzan or Susan Anbeh (born 18 March 1970, in Oberhausen) is a German actress best known to English-speaking audiences as the woman who stole Timothy Hutton away from Meg Ryan in the 1995 film French Kiss.

Anbeh was in a relationship with Austrian actor Bernhard Schir. They have a son born in 2000.

She appeared again in the lead role of Heute heiratet mein Ex (2006), a romantic comedy.

Anbeh has also been selling perfumes under the label Berlin de Vous.

Selected filmography
 French Kiss (1995) - Juliette
 Maya (2018)
 Effigy: Poison and the City (2019)

References

External links 
 

1970 births
Living people
People from Oberhausen
German film actresses
German television actresses
20th-century German actresses
21st-century German actresses